William, Bill or Billy Austin may refer to:

Literary figures
 William Austin (English writer) (1587–1634), English author of miscellany
 William Austin (poet) (before 1634–after 1666), English classical scholar
 William Austin (physician) (1754–1793), English medical doctor and author
 William Austin (American writer) (1778–1841), American author and lawyer
 William James Austin (born 1950), American poet inspired by New York City
 William D. Austin (1856–1944), American architect and author

Politicians
 William J. Austin (1822–1904), American miller, farmer and politician
 William H. Austin (1859–1922), American lawyer and politician

Sports competitors
 William Austin (cricketer) (1801–?), English first-class player
 Billy Austin (footballer) (1900–1979), English outside-right; played as Sam Austin
 Bill Austin (American football, born 1928) (1928–2013), American player and coach
 Bill Austin (American football, born 1937) (c. 1937–2015), American player with Rutgers Scarlet Knights
 Billy Austin (American football) (born 1975), American player with Indianapolis Colts

Others
 William Austin (actor) (1884–1975), British character performer
 William Austin (film editor) (1903–1993), American film and TV editor (The Atomic Submarine)
 William Austin (caricaturist) (1721–1820), English drawing master and engraver
 William Austin (bishop) (1807–1892), English-born Anglican bishop of Guyana
 William F. Austin (born 1942), American billionaire, CEO of Starkey Hearing Technologies, the largest hearing aid manufacturer in the US
 William G. Austin (1868–1929), American Army officer and Medal of Honor recipient
 William Weaver Austin (1920–2000), American musicologist, organist, and pianist

See also
 William Austin House (disambiguation)